The LG Optimus Vu (Also known as LG Intuition on Verizon) is an Android smartphone/tablet computer hybrid ("phablet"), released in August 2012 and noted for its 4:3 aspect ratio 5.0-inch screen size—between that of conventional smartphones, and larger tablets. It is powered by a 1.5 GHz quad-core Nvidia Tegra 3 CPU with Nvidia ULP GeForce GPU. The Korean version of the phone, known as LG Optimus Vu F100S was released in March, 2012, with a dual-core 1.5 GHz Qualcomm MSM 8660 Snapdragon CPU and Adreno 220 GPU, and with Android 2.3.5 Gingerbread. The Korean model has since received updates to Android 4.0.4 Ice Cream Sandwich and Android 4.1.2 Jelly Bean.

See also
 LG Optimus
 LG Intuition
 List of LG mobile phones
 Comparison of smartphones

References

 LG Optimus Vu Specifications GSMArena

Android (operating system) devices
LG Electronics smartphones
LG Electronics mobile phones
Mobile phones introduced in 2012
Discontinued smartphones